Steam-electric locomotive may refer to:
 Heilmann locomotive : experimental steam locomotives using electric transmission
 Steam turbine locomotive#Electric transmission : a locomotive that is powered by steam turbines and can drive a traction motor by turning an electric generator
 Electric-steam locomotive: a locomotive that makes use of electric heating to generate steam